Tomás Carbonell and Carlos Costa were the defending champions, but did not participate together this year.  Carbonell partnered Francisco Roig, losing in the final.  Costa partnered Christian Miniussi, losing in the first round.

Sergio Casal and Emilio Sánchez won the title, defeating Carbonell and Roig 6–3, 6–2 in the final.

Seeds

  Sergio Casal /  Emilio Sánchez (champions)
  Tomás Carbonell /  Francisco Roig (final)
  Cristian Brandi /  Federico Mordegan (first round)
  Karel Nováček /  Diego Pérez (first round)

Draw

Draw

References
Main Draw

Doubles